Louise Lovegrove is a British movie producer.

Filmography
 Padre Nuestro (2007)
 Santa Mesa (2008)
 Boy Wonder (2010)
 Cloned: The Recreator Chronicles (2012)
 Stones in the Sun (2012)
 The Brass Teapot (2012)
 The Discoverers (2012)
 The Motel Life (2012)
 Girl Rising (2013) – Afghanistan segment
 All Is Bright (2013)
 Torn (2013)
 Two Men in Town (2014)
 The End of the Tour (2015)
 The Debt (2015)
 The Phenom (2016)
 I Don't Feel at Home in This World Anymore (2017)
 Cruise (2018)
 The Man Who Killed Hitler and Then the Bigfoot (2018) – executive
 Belleville Cop (2018)
 A Call to Spy (2019)
 First Cow (2019) – executive
 The Rental (2020)
 Causeway (2022)

References

British film producers
Mass media people from Manchester
Living people
Date of birth missing (living people)
Place of birth missing (living people)
Year of birth missing (living people)